Nicola Lamon (born 1979) is an Italian harpsichordist and organist. He studied with Sergio Vartolo and Marco Vincenzi in Venice.

Discography
Ghirlanda sacra complete, 3CDs recorded 2011, released Tactus 2013

External links
website 

Italian harpsichordists
Italian organists
Living people
1979 births
Place of birth missing (living people)
Date of birth missing (living people)
21st-century Italian male musicians